Standings and results for Group 7 of the UEFA Euro 2000 qualifying tournament.

Standings

Matches

Goalscorers

References
UEFA web site

Group 7
1998–99 in Portuguese football
1999–2000 in Portuguese football
1998–99 in Romanian football
1999–2000 in Romanian football
1999–2000 in Slovak football
1998–99 in Slovak football
1999–2000 in Azerbaijani football
1998–99 in Azerbaijani football
1998–99 in Hungarian football
1999–2000 in Hungarian football
1998–99 in Liechtenstein football
1999–2000 in Liechtenstein football
Portugal at UEFA Euro 2000
Romania at UEFA Euro 2000